Gunnar Emil Gabrielsson (17 June 1891 – 29 March 1981) was a Swedish sport shooter who competed in the 1920 Summer Olympics. He won a silver medal in the team free pistol competition, and also participated in the individual free pistol event. Gabrielsson was a career military officer, reaching the rank of major.

References

External links
profile

1891 births
1981 deaths
Swedish male sport shooters
ISSF pistol shooters
Olympic shooters of Sweden
Shooters at the 1920 Summer Olympics
Olympic silver medalists for Sweden
Olympic medalists in shooting
Medalists at the 1920 Summer Olympics
Sportspeople from Blekinge County
19th-century Swedish people
20th-century Swedish people